Łucja Ochmańska (born 17 July 1949) is a Polish gymnast. She competed in six events at the 1968 Summer Olympics.

References

1949 births
Living people
Polish female artistic gymnasts
Olympic gymnasts of Poland
Gymnasts at the 1968 Summer Olympics
Sportspeople from Kraków